Michael L. Green (born September 28, 1948 in Risco, Missouri) is an American Republican politician from Michigan. He is former member of the State Senate, and is a former member of the Michigan House of Representatives. Green is also a former member of the Tuscola County Board of Commissioners, and was a tool and die maker at General Motors. He is the owner of Green's Custom Log Homes in Mayville.

References

1948 births
Living people
Republican Party members of the Michigan House of Representatives
Republican Party Michigan state senators
People from New Madrid County, Missouri
People from Tuscola County, Michigan
20th-century American politicians
21st-century American politicians